The Fussball Club Basel 1893 1980–81 season was their 87th season since the club was founded. It was their 35th consecutive season in the top flight of Swiss football after they won promotion during the season 1945–46. They played their home games in the St. Jakob Stadium. Pierre Jacques Lieblich was voted as new club chairman, he replaced René Theler who stood down at the AGM.

Overview

Pre-season
Helmut Benthaus was first team manager for the sixteenth consecutive season. There were only a few changes in the squad this off-season. Erwin Meyer moved on to Luzern and Robert Baldinger moved to lower tier Aarau. Serge Duvernois joined from Saint Louis and Martin Mullis joined from St. Gallen.  All other mutations were internal between the first team and the reserves.

Basel played a total of 52 games in their 1980–81 season. 26 matches were played in the domestic league, three in the Swiss Cup, one in the Swiss League Cup, four in the 1980–81 European Cup and 18 were friendly matches. The team scored a total of 115 goals and conceded 71. Of their 18 test games, 10 were won, five were drawn and three ended with a defeat. Three of these games were played at home in St. Jakob Stadium, the others were played away from home. In the pre-season Basel played three games in Germany and during the winter break they played three games in Singapore and Malaysia.

Domestic league
Basel played in the 1980–81 Nationalliga A. The league had been reformed and there were no more championship play-offs. Basel played a mediocre season and ended the Nationalliga in sixth position, 12 points behind Zürich who became champions. In their 26 league games Basel won nine, drew ten and lost seven matches, which meant that the totaled 28 points. They scored 48 goals, conceding 44. Erni Maissen was the team's top goalscorer scoring ten league goals. Markus Tanner was second best scorer with six goals.

Swiss Cup and League Cup
Basel entered the Swiss Cup in the round of 32. Here they were drawn away against Fribourg and they won the match 3–0. In the round of 16 they were drawn at home against Martigny-Sports and this match was won 6–0. In the quarterfinal, on 28 March 1981, Basel were drawn to play away from home against Zürich in the Letzigrund. The hosts won the tie 3–0. Basel were out of the competition and Zürich continued on to the final and won the trophy. In first round of the Swiss League Cup Basel were also drawn away against Zürich. They lost the home game 1–2 and Zürich continued in this competition and won this trophy as well.

European Cup
As reigning Swiss champions Basel were qualified for the 1980–81 European Cup. In the first round they were drawn against Club Brugge. The first leg was played in Jan Breydel Stadium in Bruges and Basel won 1–0 through a goal scored by Erni Maissen in 65th minute. The return leg was won 4–1, the goals coming from Markus Tanner (14), Jörg Stohler (48), Arthur von Wartburg (55) and Walter Geisser (81) after Brugge had taken an early lead through Jan Ceulemans (3), but their goalkeeper Leen Barth was sent off in the 17th minute. In the second round Basel were drawn against Red Star Belgrade. Basel decided the first leg for themselves 1–0, the goal scored by Detlev Lauscher. In the second leg, however, Basel were defeated 0–2 and were eliminated from the competition.

Players 

 

 
 
 
 
 

 

 
 

 
 
 

 

Players who left the squad

Results 
Legend

Friendly matches

Pre- and mid-season

Winter break

Nationalliga A

Matches

League standings

Swiss Cup

Swiss League Cup

European Cup

Round 1

Basel won 5–1 on aggregate.

Round 2

Red Star Belgrade won 2–1 on aggregate.

See also
 History of FC Basel
 List of FC Basel players
 List of FC Basel seasons

References

Sources 
 Rotblau: Jahrbuch Saison 2015/2016. Publisher: FC Basel Marketing AG. 
 Die ersten 125 Jahre. Publisher: Josef Zindel im Friedrich Reinhardt Verlag, Basel. 
 The FCB squad 1980–81 at fcb-archiv.ch
 Switzerland 1980–81 at RSSSF
 Swiss League Cup at RSSSF

External links
 FC Basel official site

FC Basel seasons
Basel